Kishsassu or Kishassu was a city in ancient Assyria. It is mentioned tablets found in Nineveh, dating from the 7th-century BCE. 

The city was subject to invasion by the Median chieftain, Kashtariti.

Some scholars suggest Kishsassu can be identified as the city of Kishisim (or Kishisu). Sargon II subdued this town, calling it Kar-Nergal or Kar-Ninib.

Gaston Maspero believes the city was located in the Gavê-Rud basin, while Adolf Billerbeck identifies Kishsassu as the ruins of Siama in the "upper valley of Lesser Zab".

References

Sources

Ancient Assyrian cities